Zero Landmine is an Extended play (EP) created to promote awareness of the problem of landmines and to promote a ban on landmines. Japanese recording artist Ryuichi Sakamoto led a collection of musicians to form a group called NML (No More Landmines), and they released the single Zero Landmine on April 25, 2001.

Overview
Sakamoto and other musicians were concerned about the issue of landmines remaining buried in several countries. Together with a number of domestic and foreign artists and musicians, Sakamoto formed the unit NML (No More Landmines). NML produced the EP recording Zero Landmine, which runs for about twenty minutes with ethnic music and singing forming the bulk of the second half of the song. David Sylvian wrote English lyrics for the song. Proceeds from the CD of the recording have gone towards de-mining efforts and other related funds.

Track listing
Zero Landmine
Zero Landmine – Piano + Vocal Version
Zero Landmine – Piano + Cello Version
Zero Landmine – Short Version
Zero Landmine – Piano Version
Zero Landmine – The Track

Participating artists

Japanese artists
UA
Taeko Ohnuki
Kazutoshi Sakurai (Mr.　Children)
Miwa Yoshida (Dreams Come True)
Masato Nakamura (Dreams Come True)
Takahiro Nishikawa (ex-Dreams Come True)
Chara
Motoharu Sano
Hideki Matsutake
Teru (Glay)
Takuro (Glay, guitar)
Ryuichi Sakamoto (keyboards, piano)
Haruomi Hosono (bass)
Yukihiro Takahashi (drums)
Sugizo (guitar)
DJ Krush (Scratch DJ)

Foreign artists
Brian Eno
Cyndi Lauper
David Sylvian
Dok-su Kim
Steve Jansen (drums)
Kraftwerk ( "Zero Landmine" sound logo)
Jadranka Stojaković
Waldemar Bastos
Jaques Morelenbaum
Nampula

External links
 Zero Landmine page at Sakamoto's website

Mine action
2001 EPs
All-star recordings